Ventseslav Kanchev (born 9 December 1953) is a Bulgarian rowing coxswain. He competed at the 1980 Summer Olympics and the 1988 Summer Olympics.

References

1953 births
Living people
Bulgarian male rowers
Olympic rowers of Bulgaria
Rowers at the 1980 Summer Olympics
Rowers at the 1988 Summer Olympics
Sportspeople from Plovdiv
Coxswains (rowing)